Warren Luhning (born July 3, 1975) is a Canadian retired professional ice hockey winger.

Playing career
He played college hockey at the University of Michigan for the Michigan Wolverines and was drafted by the New York Islanders 92nd overall. After turning professional, he played for the Dallas Stars and New York Islanders in the NHL.

Career statistics

External links

1975 births
Living people
Canadian ice hockey forwards
Dallas Stars players
Ice hockey people from Edmonton
Kalamazoo Wings (1974–2000) players
Kentucky Thoroughblades players
Lowell Lock Monsters players
Michigan Wolverines men's ice hockey players
New York Islanders draft picks
New York Islanders players
Calgary Royals players
NCAA men's ice hockey national champions